Chattock may refer to

People
Richard Samuel Chattock (1825–1906), English painter and etcher
Arthur Prince Chattock (1860–1934), British physicist
John Osler Chattock Hayes (1913–1998), Royal Navy officer who became Naval Secretary

See also
Chaddock (disambiguation)